P-47: The Phantom Fighter is a 1988 horizontally scrolling shooter arcade video game originally developed by NMK and published by Jaleco. Set during World War II, players control a Republic P-47 Thunderbolt fighter aircraft to face against the Nazis, who are occupying multiple countries around the world. Its gameplay involves destroying waves of enemies, picking up power-ups and new weapons, and destroying bosses. It ran on the Mega System 1 hardware.

P-47: The Phantom Fighter was created by NMK as a game that celebrated the fight for freedom instead of war, with composer Sizlla Okamura not wanting the music being about horrors of war and leaned towards the concept of freedom being fun instead. First launched in arcades, the game was later ported to other platforms and has since been re-released through download services for modern platforms. A conversion for the Sega Mega Drive was in development, however it did not receive an official release to the public. The title was met with mostly positive reception from critics and players alike, earning an award from Gamest magazine, however the home ports garnered mixed response from magazines, many of which also drew comparison with Silkworm. A sequel, P-47 Aces, was released in 1995.

Gameplay 

P-47: The Phantom Fighter is a horizonal-scrolling shooter game reminiscent of Silkworm, USAAF Mustang, and Hacha Mecha Fighter. Players control a Republic P-47 Thunderbolt fighter aircraft through eight stages that take place across multiple countries around the world, each with a boss at the end that must be defeated in order to progress further and face against the Nazis.

Some enemies carry icon-based power-up items that can be picked to increase the aircraft's firepower such as bombs and missiles as well as a speed booster to increase mobility. Getting hit by enemy fire or colliding against solid stage obstacles will result in losing a live, as well as a penalty of decreasing the aircraft's firepower and once all lives are lost, the game is over unless players insert more credits into the arcade machine to continue playing. After completing the last stage, the game begins again with the second loop increasing in difficulty. In addition to the single-player mode, the game also features a two-player cooperative multiplayer mode.

Development and release 
P-47: The Phantom Fighters soundtrack was scored by then-NMK member Sizlla Okamura, best known for his work in Viewpoint by Aicom. In a 2017 interview with Red Bull Music Academy, Okamura recounted his experience during development as the project's composer, stating that the team wanted a game that celebrated the fight for freedoom instead of war. Okamura did not wanted the music to be about "the horrors of war", leaning towards the concept of freedom being happy and fun, stating that "it might not sound like good “battle music” at first listen, but that's why it ended up the way it is." Okamura first composed the music using a Yamaha MSX computer, which featured the same sound chip Jaleco used for their arcade releases, before being converted into a useful program for his work to be played back and implemented for sound. Okamura also stated that, depending on the designers, he would be instructed to compose the music in a certain manner or let him handle the music compositions by himself. When asked about hardware limitations during the composition of music for arcade titles at the time, Okamura stated that he had to figure out how to use and work with a limited soundscape, in addition of what could be fit within limitations at the time.

P-47: The Phantom Fighter was first released in Japan in May 1988 and North America on August of the same year by Jaleco, as well as Europe by Electrocoin, running on the Mega System 1 board. The game was ported to various platforms including the PC-Engine (published by Aicom), Amiga, Amstrad CPC, Atari ST, Commodore 64 and MS-DOS. All home computer ports were developed by Source the Software House and published by Firebird Software in Europe under the title P47 Thunderbolt. A conversion for the Sega Mega Drive under the title The Freedom Star was in development but never released, though the Mega Drive version's soundtrack was later released as part of the SUPER Rom Cassette Disc In JALECO music album by City Connection's Clarice Disk label and has since been showcased in a playable state at a Japanese gaming event. It has received various re-releases on digital distribution platforms such as iOS by Dotemu, as well as the PlayStation Network and Nintendo eShop by Hamster Corporation as part of their Arcade Archives series. The arcade version is also included as part of the Jaleco Arcade 1 compilation for Evercade.

Reception

Arcade 

Japanese magazine Game Machine listed P-47: The Phantom Fighter on their June 15, 1988 issue as being the fourth most popular arcade game at the time. The arcade version of P-47: The Phantom Fighter earned an "Annual Hit Game" award from Gamest magazine.

Commodore User praised the addictive gameplay and graphics, stating that "this one looks set to be Jaleco's most successful product to date; it's certainly their best.". Computer and Video Games Clare Edgeley commended the graphics and regarded the game as "well worth playing." The Games Machines Robin Hogg and Cameron Pound commended the fun and addictive gameplay despite the standard graphics and sound. Your Sinclairs Ciarán Brennan regarded the title to be a poor Nemesis variant lacking speed and complexity, criticizing the low difficulty and uninspired sprites, stating that "this is definitely one for the fanatic."

Crashs Philip King and Mark Caswell regarded the presentation to be mediocre and the gameplay to be unoriginal but addictive, stating that "once you start blasting away, you'll find it hard to stop." ACEs Andy Smith stated that "the game's fun but it's not going to get your heart racing too much." Boris Schneider-Johne of German publication Power Play commended the visuals and bosses, though the slowdown when many sprites are on-screen was criticized but noted this was crucial for certain situations, stating that "if you want to let off steam for a few laps, "P-47" is just the thing. But if you are not a real action fan, the blast of air becomes too monotonous after half an hour at the latest."

Home conversions 

The PC Engine version was well received by critics. Computer and Video Games Paul Glancey praised the PC Engine port for its graphics as well as sound and gameplay, regarding it to be a "very tough arcade conversion, but veterans of computer wars past should find P-47s good blasting action both addictive and challenging." The Games Machines Phil Harrison commended the PC Engine port for its arcade-accurate presentation and music. Readers of the Japanese PC Engine Fan magazine voted to give the PC Engine port a 20.69 out of 30 score, ranking at the number 287 spot.

The Amiga port received mixed reviews from critics. CU Amiga-64s Mike Pattenden criticized the sound and difficulty level of the Amiga port. Amiga Formats Andy Smith praised the Amiga port for its arcade-accurate presentation and co-op play. Max Magenauer of German magazine Amiga Joker gave the Amiga port a mixed outlook, criticizing the graphics as well as sound, controls and gameplay. When reviewing the Amiga port, Amiga Actions Steve McNally as well as Italian magazine Amiga Byte drew comparisons with Silkworm. Zzap!64s Stuart Wynne and Phil King commended the Amiga port for its presentation, visuals, sound and co-op feature but noted the retail price to be high for a conversion. French magazine Joystick and Tilts Alain Huyghues-Lacour regarded the Amiga port to be superior than the Atari ST version, praising the visuals and playability. Daniel Melin of Swedish magazine Datormagazin praised the visuals but criticized other areas of the Amiga port. Amiga User Internationals Tony Horgan criticized the presentation, graphics, design, sound and gameplay of the Amiga port.

As with the Amiga version, the Atari ST iteration was met with mixed reception. Computer and Video Gamess Paul Rand regarded the ST port of P-47 to be a playable title as well as a good arcade conversion, but noted the graphics to be "very garish." The Ones Brian Nesbitt remarked that the visuals in the ST port were colorful but unremarkable while criticizing other issues, stating that "P-47s fun in a mindless sort of way, and it's tough enough to keep most players on their toes - but not for any great length of time... especially at the price." ST Action praised its appealing simplicity and playability. As with the Amiga iteration, French magazine Génération 4 as well as Micro Newss Marc Lacombe and Zeros Matt Bielby drew comparisons with Silkworm when reviewing the ST port. Aktueller Software Markts Peter Braun praised the graphics, sound and gameplay of the ST port, stating that "P 47 can be recommended to all those who are fed up with adventure and strategy construction sites and want to hit the wall again with a good action game." Martin Gaksch of German magazine Power Play commended the gameplay speed and co-op feature of the ST port but criticized various in-game issues, regarding the game to be an average shooting game. Joysticks Jean-Marc Demoly commended the ST port for its realistic-looking graphics, parallax scrolling effects, sound design and playability. Tilts Alain Huyghues-Lacour commended the visuals and animations, recommending arcade arcade players enough to give the ST port a try.

French magazine Amstar praised the Amstrad CPC port for being "an excellent conversion of the arcade game of the same name", praising the visual presentation and difficulty level. Amstrad Actions Trenton Webb and Rod Lawton praised the CPC port for its visual presentation and addictive gameplay, though Lawton ultimately remarked that the game was "just another shoot-em-up when all's said and done". Alian of French publication Amstrad Cent Pour Cent commended the overall quality of the CPC port. Joysticks Bó TGV drew comparison with Silkworm when reviewing the CPC port but commended the conversion for its presentation and sound. Tilts Alain Huyghues-Lacour praised the CPC port for being better than the Atari ST iteration, commending the graphics and gameplay but lamented the lack of co-op play.

Zzap!64s Stuart Wynne and Phil King regarded the Commodore 64 port to be not as slick as the Amiga iteration, criticizing the lack of co-op play as well as the visual presentation. Aktueller Software Markts Torsten Blum regarded the C64 port to be disappointing, criticizing the jerky-scrolling background graphics and lack of music during gameplay, however the sprite animations were praised. Your Commodores Ashley Cotter-Cairns gave the C64 port an overall negative outlook, criticizing the sprite flickering indistinct backgrounds, among other issues. Commodore Forces Miles Guttery criticized the preset enemy patterns but regarded the C64 port to be a "fair trigger exercise." The Games Machines Warren Lapworth praised the MS-DOS port for its arcade-accurate visuals and adjustable gameplay options but criticized the sound effects and keyboard controls, stating that "P47's still a jolly little shoot-'em-up."

Crashs Mark Caswell and Nick Roberts commended the ZX Spectrum port for its visual presentation, however Caswell stated that "P-47 holds nothing new in the way it plays, but could just give the hardened shoot-'em-up fan a challenge." Sinclair Users Jim Douglas drew comparison with Silkworm but commended the visuals and playability, stating that the Spectrum port is a "clean conversion of an average coin-op. Low on skill but high on kill." Your Sinclairs Robin Candy regarded the Spectrum port to be a traditional horizonal-scrolling shoot 'em up, criticizing the overly detailed backgrounds that leads enemy bullets blend within the scenery, however Candy stated that "P47 may not be R-Type, but it's a perfectly competent and satisfying addition to the Speccy stable of shoot-'em-ups." Spanish magazine MicroHobby praised the Spectrum port for its visuals, controls, sound and replayability.

Sequel 
 See main article: P-47 Aces
In 1995, an arcade-only sequel titled P-47 Aces was developed by NMK and published by Jaleco for the Mega System 32 hardware. The sequel has the same concept but has some differences in gameplay such as players having the option to select four different airplanes with their own unique abilities. In Japan, it proved to be a popular arcade game.

Notes

References

External links 
 P-47: The Phantom Fighter at Killer List of Videogames

1988 video games
Amiga games
Amstrad CPC games
Arcade video games
Atari ST games
Cancelled Sega Genesis games
City Connection franchises
Commodore 64 games
DOS games
Nintendo Switch games
PlayStation 4 games
Horizontally scrolling shooters
Jaleco games
NMK (company) games
TurboGrafx-16 games
Video games developed in Japan
Video games scored by David Lowe
Video games scored by Sizlla Okamura
ZX Spectrum games
Hamster Corporation games
Multiplayer and single-player video games
Cooperative video games